is a Japanese YouTuber, singer and former member of the idol group Shiritsu Ebisu Chugaku. She was active with the group from April 10, 2010, to January 3, 2018.

Discography 
 Also See Shiritsu Ebisu Chugaku Discography.

Singles 

 aiai to Iku, Nihon Zenkoku Tetsudou no Tabi (2015)
 Suki ni Erabeba Iijan (2019)

EP's 

 Fuyu Kurinaba Haru Tookaraji. (2020)

Filmography

Film 
  (2015), Hiyoko Hoshino
  (2015)
  (2017)
  (2018)

Voice acting 
  (Unikyara Project MoguP) Hiroshima Home TV

References

External links 
 Aika Hirota profile on the Stardust Promotion website
 廣田あいかオフィシャルブログ 「愛式。」 Powered by Ameba（2018年5月22日 - ）
 

Shiritsu Ebisu Chugaku members
1999 births
Living people
Japanese women pop singers
Japanese idols
Japanese child singers
Musicians from Saitama Prefecture
Japanese voice actresses
Singers from Tokyo
21st-century Japanese singers
21st-century Japanese actresses
21st-century Japanese women singers